The Brown–Providence men's ice hockey rivalry is a college ice hockey rivalry between the Brown Bears men's ice hockey and Providence Friars men's ice hockey programs. The first meeting between the two occurred on 1 March 1927 but wasn't played annually until 1952.

History
While Brown had first played varsity ice hockey as far back as the 19th century, the team did not have any local facility and was forced to suspend operations for 20 years. In 1926, the Rhode Island Auditorium was built and enable the school to restart its program. The same year, Providence College began its ice hockey team, however, the new team lasted just one year before being mothballed. Providence returned to the ice after World War II and the two teams promptly began playing one another. The teams became fast rivals, sharing not only a state and a city but a home rink as well.

Brown and Providence typically played one another twice a season and both were founding members of ECAC Hockey in 1961. Coincidentally, that was also the season that Brown completed the Meehan Auditorium, giving the program its first permanent on-campus home. A decade later, Providence followed suit, building the Schneider Arena. While the two played as conference opponents for over 20 years, they never met in a playoff game.

In 1984, Providence was one of seven member schools to leave the ECAC and form Hockey East. In order to continue the rivalry between the programs, the two schools began awarding the 'Mayor's Cup' to the winner of their annual match. In the years since splitting into separate conferences, Brown and Providence have played one another at least once a season except for 1987 and 2021 (as of 2022).

Game results
Full game results for the rivalry, with rankings beginning in the 1998–99 season.

Series facts

References

External links
 Brown Bears men's ice hockey
 Providence Friars men's ice hockey

College ice hockey rivalries in the United States
Brown Bears men's ice hockey
Providence Friars men's ice hockey
1927 establishments in Rhode Island